This is a list of libraries in Afghanistan.

Libraries 

 Afghanistan Center at Kabul University (ACKU) library
 Afghanistan Research and Evaluation Unit (AREU) Library
 Amir Khusrou Balkhi Library
 Kabul Public Library
 Kabul University Library
 Library of the National Bank
 Library of the Press and Information Department
 Ministry of Education Library
 National Library of Afghanistan
 Dehkada Library, Ghor
 Nazo Annah Library

See also 

 List of museums in Afghanistan

External links 
 https://coral.uchicago.edu:8443/display/lasa/Afghanistan

 
Afghanistan
Libraries
Libraries